Všestary is a municipality and village in Hradec Králové District in the Hradec Králové Region of the Czech Republic. It has about 1,800 inhabitants.

Administrative parts
Villages of Bříza, Chlum, Lípa, Rosnice and Rozběřice are administrative parts of Praskačka.

References

External links

Villages in Hradec Králové District